Silesian dumplings (Silesian German: schläsche Kließla) are potato dumplings traditional to the Silesia region of Poland and Germany. They are also called białe kluski ("white dumplings").

Preparation 
The dough for white dumplings is made of first boiled and then mashed potatoes (moderately cooled, but still warm), potato flour and a little bit of salt. The ratio of potatoes and flour is about 3:1 or 4:1. In some recipes, a whole egg may be added to the dough (this helps shaping if the mashed potatoes cooled too much and the shaping becomes problematic).

There are two methods of forming the dumplings. The first one is by slicing them up with a knife from the dough rolls. The other way is to just hand roll them from the dough and flatten. Finally, a depression for gravy is made with a thumb. The dumplings are then boiled in salted water until they float to the surface.

Service 
The dish consisting of the dumplings, fried beef rouladen with rich gravy, and boiled red cabbage is (or used to be) an invariable component of the Sunday dinner in many traditional Silesian families. Left-over dumplings can be reheated or fried (like potatoes) for supper and eaten with left-over gravy or butter.

See also 
 Black dumplings – a similar dish
Raspeball
Black noodles

References 

Silesian cuisine
Dumplings
Potato dishes